By the Sword Divided is a British television series produced by the BBC between 1983 and 1985.

The series, created by John Hawkesworth, was a historical drama set during the mid-17th century, dealing with the impact of the English Civil War on the fictional Lacey family, made up of both Royalist and Parliamentarian supporters.

It follows the family as it is torn apart by the conflicting and changing loyalties of the war, as families were during that time, and the defeat of the Royalist forces at the end of the First English Civil War. Series two covers the second and third civil wars and the eventual Restoration of the Monarchy. The last episodes see the surviving members of the family (from both sides of the divide) witness the arrival of King Charles II on a visit to the ancestral Lacey home.

Cast

Regular Cast

 Lucy Aston – Lucinda Lacey/Ferrar
 Timothy Bentinck – Sir Thomas (Tom) Lacey
 Simon Butteriss – Hugh Brandon
 Judy Buxton – Susan Protheroe/Winter
 Jeremy Clyde – HM King Charles I
 Rosalie Crutchley – Goodwife Margaret
 Rob Edwards – John Fletcher
 Peter Guinness – Dick Skinner
 Janet Lees Price – Emma Bowen/Skinner
 Andrew McCulloch – Captain/Colonel Leckie
 Andrew MacLachlan – Nathaniel Cropper
 Sharon Maughan – Anne Lacey/Fletcher
 Bert Parnaby – Sir Austin Fletcher
 Edward Peel – Walter Jackman
 Eileen Way – Minty

Series 1 only:

 Ben Aris – Edmund Waller
 Tim Brierley – Lord Edward Ferrar
 Mark Burns – Captain Charles Pike
 Simon Dutton – Will Saltmarsh
 Julian Glover – Sir Martin Lacey
 Charles Kay – Sir Henry Parkin
 Frank Mills – Matthew Saltmarsh
 Michael Parkhouse – Sam Saltmarsh
 Malcolm Stoddard – Captain/Colonel Hannibal Marsh
 Jerome Willis – John Pym

Series 2 only:

 Cyril Appleton – Mayor of Swinford
 Peter Birch – Lord Edward Ferrar
 David Collings – John Thurloe
 Peter Jeffrey – Oliver Cromwell
 Joanna McCallum – Lady Frances Neville/Lacey
 Christopher Neame – Henry Snelling
 Sir Robert Stephens – Sir Ralph Winter
 Malcolm Terris – Gabriel Rudd
 Gareth Thomas – Major-General Horton
 Simon Treves – HM King Charles II
 John Woodvine – Solicitor General

Episodes

Series 1

Series 2

Film locations
The filming for the programme took place at Fermyn Woods Hall, Rockingham Castle and Lilford Hall in Northamptonshire.

DVD release
By the Sword Divided is available on DVD in the UK, distributed by Acorn Media UK.

References

External links
 
Episode 1: Gather Ye Rosebuds at YouTube
Episode 2: This War without an Enemy at YouTube
Episode 3: The Sound of Drums at YouTube
Episode 4: A Silver Moon at YouTube
Episode 5: The Edge of the Sword at YouTube
Episode 6: Outrageous Fortune at YouTube
Episode 7: A Sea of Dangers at YouTube
Episode 8: Ring of Fire at YouTube
Episode 9: Ashes to Ashes at YouTube
Episode 10: Not Peace, but a Sword at YouTube
Part 2 Episode 1: Conflicts at YouTube
Part 2 Episode 2: Cruel Necessity at YouTube
Part 2 Episode 3: Cromwell at Arnescote at YouTube
Part 2 Episode 4: Witch Hunt at YouTube
Part 2 Episode 5: Escape at YouTube
Part 2 Episode 6: Fateful Days at YouTube
Part 2 Episode 7: Forlorn Hope at YouTube
Part 2 Episode 8: The Mailed Fist at YouTube
Part 2 Episode 9: Retribution at YouTube
Part 2 Episode 10: Restoration at YouTube

1983 British television series debuts
1985 British television series endings
1980s British drama television series
BBC television dramas
Period television series
English Civil War fiction
English Civil War films
English-language television shows
Cultural depictions of Charles II of England
Cultural depictions of Oliver Cromwell
Television series set in the 17th century